Rubicon Exotic Juices (Rubicon Food Products Limited) is a beverage manufacturer based in Richmond Hill, Ontario, Canada. The company specializes in producing juice drinks from exotic fruits.

Events
Rubicon in 2010 won M award for the favourite Swedish drink of the year.

In 2007, Rubicon was the sponsor of the Urban Music Awards. Rubicon has also sponsored Sky Sports' coverage of the ICC Cricket World Cup and World Twenty20 Championship, with the catchphrase "Time for a Rubicon break" often heard before adverts.

References

External links 
 

1982 establishments in England
British companies established in 1982
British soft drink brands
Carbonated drinks
Drink companies of the United Kingdom
Food and drink companies established in 1982